Arjun Sethi (born January 15, 1983) is an American internet entrepreneur, investor and executive. He is co-founder and partner at venture capital firm Tribe Capital. He previously was partner at Social Capital and served as an executive at Yahoo! where he launched Yahoo! Livetext. Before that, he was co-founder and CEO of MessageMe (acquired by Yahoo!) and he was CEO of Lolapps, the developer behind Ravenwood Fair.

Career

Lolapps 
In 2008, Sethi took the role as CEO of Lolapps, which developed social games on the Facebook platform. Lolapps developed Ravenwood Fair which had 10 million monthly active users. At its peak, Lolapps had 150 million monthly active users across its portfolio of games.

Lolapps merged with game publisher 6waves in 2011 which made the merged entity 6waves Lolapps the second largest game publisher on Facebook measured by monthly active users after Zynga. Sethi became Chief Product Officer in 6waves Lolapps, which went on to raise $35 million in funding from Korean gaming company Nexon.

In 2012, 6waves Lolapps laid off most of its development team and Sethi left to join venture capital firm Social Capital as an entrepreneur in residence.

6waves Lolapps subsequently rebranded itself as 6waves, dropping Lolapps from its name. In January 2022, Stillfront Group acquired 6waves for $201M.

Angel investments 
Sethi began angel investing at Lolapps. He is now considered one of the top angel investors in Silicon Valley. His angel investments include Opendoor, Gusto and Long-Term Stock Exchange.

MessageMe and Yahoo 
Later in 2012, Sethi became co-founder and CEO of mobile messaging app MessageMe. MessageMe reached 5 million users within 75 days of launch. The company raised close to $12 million across two rounds of funding led by Greylock Partners.

MessageMe's rapid growth led to Facebook revoking its access to the Facebook Platform’s “Find Friends” functionality for competitive reasons. Leaked internal Facebook emails expressed concern about resulting negative publicity for Facebook, particularly given Sethi’s relationship with Social Capital and previous position at Lolapps.

Yahoo acquired MessageMe in 2014 for a price between $30 million and $40 million,
 shut down the app MessageMe, and put Sethi and the ex-MessageMe team to work on a Yahoo messaging app meant to compete with Snapchat and WhatsApp. Yahoo's acquisition of MessageMe was part of CEO Marissa Mayer's larger strategy to bring in new talent via small startup acquisitions.

In 2015, Sethi and the former MessageMe team launched Yahoo! Livetext, an audio-free video messaging app. It never gained significant traction and Yahoo shut down the product in 2016.

Social Capital 
In early 2016, Sethi left Yahoo to join Social Capital as an investing partner focused on consumer startups.

At Social Capital, Sethi backed the firm's investments in and served on the board of directors of Carta, Relativity Space, Cover, and CryptoMove.

Tribe Capital 
In 2018, three former Social Capital investing partners, Sethi, Ted Maidenberg and Jonathan Hsu, left to form Tribe Capital with $200 million targeted for its first fund. Tribe invests in early-stage startups and uses quantitative data to inform investment decisions. As of July 2021, Tribe has approximately $1.5 billion in assets under management.

At Tribe, Sethi made its first investment in cryptocurrency trading platform SFOX. He also followed on to his investments in Carta, Relativity Space, and Cover. Other Tribe investments include FTX, Kraken, Applied Intuition, EquipmentShare, Pipe Technologies, Docker, Republic, Instabase, and Momentus. Sethi serves on the board of directors of Kraken and Docker.

In 2020, Tribe launched its investing program Firstlook to allow accredited investors to co-invest in selected companies alongside Tribe.

In March 2021, Tribe and Arrow Capital co-sponsored a SPAC raising $240 million, led by Sethi as CEO. Tribe filed plans for a second SPAC IPO later that month, with Odell Beckham Jr. serving as strategic advisor.

In July 2022, Tribe announced that it launched an incubator program Tribe Crypto Labs, which had raised $25M from outside investors.

Nibiru 
In September 2022, Sethi co-founded a crypto derivatives trading protocol named Nibiru. He raised $7.5M at a $100M valuation.

References

External links 
 Arjun Sethi on LinkedIn
 Arjun Sethi on Twitter
 Personal blog

Yahoo! employees
1983 births
Living people
University of Maryland, College Park alumni
Businesspeople in information technology
American technology company founders
American financial businesspeople
American venture capitalists
Venture capitalists
Angel investors